Boschi Sant'Anna is a comune with 1,346 inhabitants in the province of Verona.

References

Cities and towns in Veneto